Mount Cheeseman is a club snowfield in New Zealand's South Island, near the town of Springfield, about an hour and a half  (111km) from Christchurch.

Situated in a south-east-facing basin, it features two T-bar lifts and one learner tow. The runs cover an elevation range of 1570–1840 metres, with a distribution of 15% beginner slopes, 50% intermediate, and 35% advanced. Some of the slopes are groomed.

There is accommodation for 68 people in the onsite Snowline Lodge, and for 38 in the nearby Forest Lodge.

It is named for the botanist Thomas Frederic Cheeseman, who was curator of Auckland Museum and a recipient of the Linnean Medal.

References

External links

Cheeseman
Cheeseman
Cheeseman